The Four Corner Hustlers (4CH) is an African American street gang founded in the West Garfield Park neighborhood on the West Side of Chicago in the 1960s by Walter Wheat and Freddy Gauge. The Four Corner Hustlers at first were a single gang that would wear the colors black and brown. 

They were not in an alliance until the Vice Lords and the Four Corner Hustlers became allies, which later formed the group now known as People Nation. The gang has a reputation to be the most violent and feared street gang  on the West Side of Chicago.

Symbols 
The gang colors are black and red and black and gold, serving under Vice Lords. They associate themselves with a black diamond with "points" at each corner.

References

External links
 Gangland

Organizations established in the 1960s
1960s establishments in Illinois
African-American gangs
People Nation
African-American history in Chicago
Gangs in Chicago